Black Tie is the twelfth studio album by American vocal group, The Manhattans, released in 1981 through Columbia Records.

Reception
The album peaked at No. 21 on the R&B albums chart. It also reached No. 86 on the Billboard 200. The album features the singles "Just One Moment Away", "Let Your Love Come Down", and "Honey, Honey", which peaked at No. 19, No.77, and No. 25 on the Hot Soul Singles chart, respectively.

Track listing

Charts
Album

Singles

References

External links
 

1981 albums
The Manhattans albums
Columbia Records albums
Albums produced by Leo Graham (songwriter)